Adam Harper is a mathematician specialising in number theory, particularly in analytic, combinatorial and probabilistic number theory, and serving as Assistant Professor with University of Warwick, England. Harper was awarded the  SASTRA Ramanujan Prize in 2019 "for several outstanding contributions to analytic and probabilistic number theory." This annual prize is awarded for outstanding contributions by individuals not exceeding the age of 32 in areas of mathematics influenced by Srinivasa Ramanujan.  The age limit has been set at 32 because Ramanujan died at the age of 32 years.

"Harper's research, both individually and in collaboration, covers the theory of the Riemann zeta function, random multiplicative functions, S-unit equations, smooth numbers, the large sieve, and the recent highly innovative "pretentious" approach to number theory. In establishing these results, he has shown mastery over probabilistic methods which he has used with remarkable effect in analytic number theory."

Academic career
Adam  Harper  was born  in  Lowestoft  in  the  United Kingdom. He  did  a  four year MMath Course at Exeter College, Oxford and won the Oxford Junior Mathematics Prize. He  was  a Post-Doctoral Fellow with Professor Andrew Granville at CRM Montréal during 2012–13, following  which  he  was  a  Research  Fellow  at  Jesus College, Cambridge  during 2013–16. He returned to Montréal in 2018 as Simons CRM Visiting Professor. He is currently an Assistant Professor at the University of Warwick.

Other awards

Adam Harper was awarded a Whitehead Prize in 2020 for "his deep and important contributions to analytic number theory, and in particular for his work on the value distribution of the Riemann zeta function and random multiplicative functions using sophisticated ideas and techniques from probability theory."

References

Number theorists
Recipients of the SASTRA Ramanujan Prize
Living people
Year of birth missing (living people)